Bertelsen  and Berthelsen are Danish-Norwegian patronymic surnames meaning "son of Bertel" or cognate "Berthel" (both equivalent of the Biblical Βαρθολομαίος/Bartholomaios, cf. English Bartholomew). 
There are several people with this surname:

Bertelsen 
Aage Bertelsen (1873–1945), Danish artist
Albert Bertelsen (1921–2019), Danish artist
Jens Jørn Bertelsen (born 1952), Danish footballer
Jim Bertelsen (1950–2021), American football player
Karen Bertelsen, Canadian TV host
Ola Bertelsen (1864–1946),  Norwegian politician
Trond Erik Bertelsen (born 1984)  Norwegian footballer

Berthelsen 
Berit Berthelsen (born 1944), retired athlete from Norway
Bernhard Berthelsen (1897–1964), Norwegian politician for the Liberal Party
Hermann Berthelsen (born 1956), Greenlandic politician and mayor of Sisimiut
Jacob Berthelsen (born 1986), Danish professional football (soccer) player
Johann Berthelsen (1883–1972), prominent and prolific American Impressionist painter
Julie Berthelsen (born 1979), Danish (Greenlandic) singer and songwriter
Richard Berthelsen (born 1944), former interim executive director of the NFL Players Association
Roar Berthelsen (1934–1990), Norwegian long jumper

Other
Bertelsen Glacier, Greenland
Bertelsen's lanternfish

See also 
Bertel

Danish-language surnames
Norwegian-language surnames